The Brisbane Bears Club Champion was an award given to the Brisbane Bears player determined to have been the "best and fairest" throughout an AFL season, from 1987 to 1996.

Recipients

Multiple winners

References

Brisbane Bears
Australian Football League awards
Awards established in 1987
Awards disestablished in 1996
Australian rules football-related lists